William Milton Landau (October 10, 1924 – November 2, 2017) was an American neurologist who was a professor of neurology at the Washington University School of Medicine in St. Louis, Missouri. It was within his specialty of stroke and movement disorders that he gained eponymous recognition for the Landau–Kleffner syndrome.

Landau died November 2, 2017, of natural causes at his home in University City, Missouri. He was 93.

Works published
 Landau WM, Jaffe AS, Wetzel RD. Benefits vs the harms of automated external defibrillator use. JAMA. 2006 Jun 28;295(24):2849-50; author reply 2850.  
 Landau WM. Pain therapy outdated. Mo Med. 2006 Jan-Feb;103(1):42.  
 Nelson DA, Landau WM. Intrathecal methylprednisolone for postherpetic neuralgia. N Engl J Med 2001; Mar 29;344(13):1019; discussion 1021-2
 Landau WM. Is cholesterol a risk factor for stroke? Cholesterol-NO. Arch Neuro 1999; 56:1521-1524
 Landau WM. "Hypertonus Spasticity, Rigidity" and "Babinski's Reflex, Sign of". Encyclopedia of Neuroscience. Edited by George Adelman, Barry H. Smith, Elsevier Science BV, 1999
 Landau WM. Clinical Neuromythology and Other Arguments and Essays, Pertinent and Impertinent, Futura Publishing Company, Inc,. Armonk, NY, 1998

References

1924 births
2017 deaths
People from St. Louis
American neurologists
Washington University in St. Louis faculty